Fort Sanders Regional Medical Center is a 541-bed non-profit hospital in the Fort Sanders neighborhood of Knoxville, Tennessee. It is owned and operated by Covenant Health.

History 
Fort Sanders Regional Medical Center dates back to May 29, 1919, when a charter for a new hospital on the site of the Civil War Battle of Fort Sanders was granted. The hospital officially opened in 1920, admitting its first patients on February 23.

In 2018, the hospital began a $115 million expansion of the emergency room and critical care unit. The new emergency department was opened in March 2020, and the extension was completed in 2021.

Facilities 
Fort Sanders Regional Medical Center is a Joint Commission certified comprehensive stroke center. The hospital also houses the Patricia Neal Rehabilitation Center, a 22-bed rehabilitation hospital, as well as a transitional care unit skilled nursing facility.

References

External links 
 Fort Sanders Regional Medical Center

Hospital buildings completed in 1920
Hospitals in Tennessee